Greenhill may refer to:

People
 Greenhill (surname)

Places
In the UK
 Greenhill, Camden, London, England
 Greenhill, County Antrim, a townland in County Antrim, Northern Ireland
 Greenhill, County Durham, England
 Greenhill, County Fermanagh, a townland in County Fermanagh, Northern Ireland
 Greenhill, Dorset, England
 Greenhill, a neighbourhood of Coatbridge, Scotland
 Greenhill, Dumfriesshire, Scotland
 Greenhill, Edinburgh, Scotland
 Greenhill, Evesham, Worcestershire, England, main location of the Battle of Evesham in 1265
 Greenhill, Falkirk, Scotland
 Greenhill, Harrow, London, England
 Greenhill, Herefordshire England
 Greenhill, Kent, England
 Greenhill, Kidderminster, Worcestershire, England
 Greenhill, Lancashire, England
 Greenhill, Leicestershire, England
 Greenhill, Sheffield, England
 Greenhill, Swansea, Wales

Elsewhere
 Greenhill, Nova Scotia, Canada
 Zielonagóra (Greenhill), a village in Greater Poland Voivodeship, Szamotuły County, Obrzycko commune, Poland
 Greenhill, South Australia, a suburb in Australia
Greenhill Recreation Park, a protected area in South Australia
Greenhill Ogham Stones, Republic of Ireland

Businesses and institutions
 Greenhill & Co., a New York-based investment bank
 Greenhill School (Addison, Texas), Addison, Texas, United States
 Ysgol Greenhill School, Pembrokeshire, Wales, United Kingdom

Titles
 Baron Greenhill (of Townhead in the City of Glasgow)
 Baron Greenhill of Harrow
 Greenhill-Russell Baronets

See also
 Green Hill (disambiguation)
 Green Hills (disambiguation)
 Greenhills (disambiguation)
 Greensill, and Greensill Capital a UK-based steel conglomerate
 Grinnell (disambiguation)